The Type 2 machine gun was developed for aerial use for the Imperial Japanese Navy during World War II. It was an adaptation of the German MG 131 machine gun.

Installations
 Aichi B7A
 Aichi E16A
 Mitsubishi A6M5c
 Mitsubishi G4M
 Nakajima B6N
 Yokosuka P1Y

References

Aircraft guns
World War II weapons of Japan